Viaje al centro de la Tierra (English: Journey to the Center of the Earth) is a 1977 Spanish adventure film based on the 1864 novel Journey to the Center of the Earth by Jules Verne. It has been released under the titles Where Time Began in theaters in the U.S. and The Fabulous Journey to the Centre of the Earth on TV in the U.K.

Plot
A group of geologists, including Professor Otto Lidenbrock, discuss various theories on the make-up off the interior of the Earth. They decide that the only way to know for sure would be to mount an expedition to discover which theory was true.

Whilst visiting a book shop, Lidenbrock (More) buys an old book, written by Arne Saknussemm, containing undisclosed, coded knowledge of the center of the Earth from a mysterious gentleman. Eager to know more, he enlists his niece Glauben and her lover Axel, a soldier. Axel is charged with keeping a diary of the journey, and often enhances his contributions to the exhibition.

Upon arriving in Iceland, they hire shepherd and mountaineer Hans. Together, the four of them set off for the adventure of a lifetime to the center of the Earth. After a series of mishaps, including losing the mysterious book, about midway through their journey, Olsen, a time traveling scientist, meets the explorers.

Olsen reveals to the other travelers the existence of a lost city, where clones of Olsen are conducting experiments, using a mysterious box. Olsen shows the group the flora and fauna of middle-Earth, including surviving dinosaurs. Olsen later sets off an explosion to allow the others to escape back to their home.

Some years later, Glauben and Axel are married, and Hans has become a successful shepherd. Linderbrook still searches old bookstores, hoping for more information. In 1 of those shops, Linderbrook is told that a package has been left for him, and it proves to be Olsen's experimental box.  Looking through the store window, Linderbrook sees Olsen, now much older, looking back at him.

Cast
 Kenneth More as Professor Otto Lidenbrock
  as Axel (dubbed by Christopher Guard)
 Ivonne Sentis as Glauben (dubbed by Deborah Watling)
 Frank Braña as Hans  
 Jack Taylor as Olsen 
 Emiliano Redondo as Professor Kristoff 
 Lone Fleming as Molly 
 Ricardo Palacios as a train ticket collector  
 José María Caffarel as a professor  
 George Rigaud as a professor (as Jorge Rigaud)
 Barta Barri as a professor  
 Ángel Álvarez as a professor

Reception
Creature Feature found the movie to be sluggish and boring, giving it two out of five stars. It found the movie did improve when the dinosaurs finally appeared, but that the effects were weak. Monster Hunter found the use of shooting in a real cave to be a plus, but that there was little else of worth in the film.

Home media
The film was released on DVD in 2006

See also
Journey to the Center of the Earth (1959 film)
Journey to the Center of the Earth (2008 Hollywood film)
Journey to the Center of the Earth (2008 Asylum film)

References

External links

1978 films
1970s Spanish-language films
Films shot in the Canary Islands
Films directed by Juan Piquer Simon
Films based on Journey to the Center of the Earth
1970s science fiction adventure films
Travel to the Earth's center
Spanish science fiction adventure films
Films set in the 19th century